"Sweet Night" is a song recorded by South Korean singer V of BTS as the soundtrack of the 2020 South Korean television series Itaewon Class. It was released for digital download and streaming on March 13, 2020, by Vlending Company.

Commercial performance
"Sweet Night" debuted at number 39 on South Korea's Gaon Digital Chart in the chart issue dated March 8–14, 2020; on its component charts, the song debuted at number three on the Gaon Download Chart, number 89 on the Gaon Streaming Chart, and number 31 on the Gaon BGM Chart. In the following week, it ascended to number 14 on the Gaon Digital Chart, and number 22 on the Gaon Streaming Chart.

Charts

Release history

References 

2020 songs
2020 singles
Korean-language songs
Songs written by Adora (singer)
South Korean television drama theme songs